Karl-Heinz Ohlig (born 15 September 1938 in Koblenz) is a German professor of Religious Studies and the History of Christianity at the University of Saarland, Germany.

He is the co-editor with Gerd Rudiger Puin of the book Die dunklen Anfänge. Neue Forschungen zur Entstehung und frühen Geschichte des Islam ["The Hidden Origins of Islam: New Research Into Its Early History" (Hans Schiller Verlag, 2005/Prometheus Books 2008)], which argues that Islam was not originally conceived as a distinct religion.

Ohlig and Puin's thesis propounds that according to the evidence of Arab coinage, and the inscription in the Dome of the Rock in the late 7th century, with the letters MHMT and the term Muhammad meaning "the revered" or "the praiseworthy" and the Dome's bearing Christian symbols such as crosses, it suggests that the term Muhammad was a Christian honorific title referring to Jesus, as in the hymn of the mass ("praise be to he that comes...")

With his approach of research Ohlig is a representative of the "Saarbrücken School" which is part of the Revisionist School of Islamic Studies.

Works

See also 
 Historicity of Muhammad
 Christoph Luxenberg

Academic staff of Saarland University
20th-century German Catholic theologians
21st-century German Catholic theologians
1938 births
Living people
German male non-fiction writers